Tommy Nielsen (born 11 November 1967) is a Danish former cyclist. He competed in the road race at the 1988 Summer Olympics.

References

External links
 

1967 births
Living people
Danish male cyclists
Olympic cyclists of Denmark
Cyclists at the 1988 Summer Olympics
People from Hillerød Municipality
Sportspeople from the Capital Region of Denmark